Vesselowskya is a genus of 2 species of shrub to small tree in the family Cunoniaceae endemic to New South Wales, Australia.  They are found in cool, temperate mountain ranges, normally in country dominated by Nothofagus moorei forests. The common name for these plants is marara.

Cunoniaceae
Oxalidales genera
Oxalidales of Australia
Flora of New South Wales